Arbuzov (masculine) or Arbuzova (feminine) is a Russian surname, derived from the word арбуз (arbooz, meaning "watermelon"). It may refer to:

 Aleksandr Arbuzov (1877–1968), Russian and Soviet chemist
 Aleksei Arbuzov (1908–1986), Soviet playwright
 Boris Arbuzov (1903–1991), Russian and Soviet chemist
 Boris Arbuzov (b. 1938), Russian and Soviet physicist
 Serhiy Arbuzov (b. 1976), former bank director and former Vice Prime Minister of Ukraine in 2014

Russian-language surnames